When Worlds Collide is a 1933 science fiction novel co-written by Edwin Balmer and Philip Wylie; they also co-authored the sequel After Worlds Collide (1934).  It was first published as a six-part monthly serial (September 1932 through February 1933) in Blue Book magazine, illustrated by Joseph Franké.

Synopsis
Sven Bronson, a Swedish astronomer working at an observatory in South Africa, discovers a pair of rogue planets, Bronson Alpha and Bronson Beta, which will soon enter the Solar System. In eight months, they will pass close enough for gravitational forces to cause catastrophic damage to the Earth. Sixteen months later, after swinging around the Sun, Bronson Alpha (a gas giant) will return to pulverize the Earth and depart. Bronson Beta (discovered to be Earth-like and potentially habitable) may remain and assume a stable orbit.

Scientists led by Cole Hendron work desperately to build an atomic rocket to transport enough people, animals and equipment to Bronson Beta to save humanity from extinction. Various countries do the same. The United States evacuates coastal regions in preparation for the first encounter. As the planets approach, observers see through their telescopes cities on Bronson Beta. Bronson Alpha grazes and destroys the Moon.

Three men take a floatplane to check out conditions across the United States and meet with the President in Hutchinson, Kansas, the temporary capital of the United States. All three are wounded fighting off a mob at their last stop, but manage to return with a precious sample of an extremely heat-resistant metal one of them had noticed. This solves the last remaining engineering obstacle: no material had been found before to make rocket tubes capable of withstanding the heat of the atomic exhaust.

Five months before the end, desperate mobs attack the camp, killing over half of Hendron's people before they are defeated. With the rocket tube breakthrough, the survivors are able to build a second, larger ship that can carry everyone left alive (instead of only 100 of the roughly thousand people Hendron had recruited). The two American ships take off, but lose contact with each other. Other ships are seen launching from Europe; the French ship's tubes melt, causing it to crash. The original American ship makes a successful landing, but it is unknown if anyone else made it. The survivors find that Bronson Beta is habitable. They also find a road.

The sequel, After Worlds Collide, details the fate of the survivors on Bronson Beta.

Adaptations and influences
When Worlds Collide had far-reaching influences on the science fiction genre. The themes of an approaching planet threatening the Earth, and an athletic hero, his girlfriend, and a scientist traveling to the new planet by rocket, were used by writer Alex Raymond in his 1934 comic strip Flash Gordon. Jack Williamson's 1934 short story "Born of the Sun" also used the concept of a scientist and his fiancée escaping the destruction of the Earth in a hurriedly constructed "ark of space". The 1940–1941 newspaper comic strip Speed Spaulding, an adaptation credited to the novel's authors, was more directly based on the novel. The themes of escape from a doomed planet to a habitable one also can be seen in Jerry Siegel and Joe Shuster's 1938 comic Superman.

The novel was adapted as the 1951 film When Worlds Collide, produced by George Pal and directed by Rudolph Maté.

In 2012, the British composer Nigel Clarke wrote a large-scale work for brass band inspired by the film and likewise titled When Worlds Collide.

See also
 Worlds in Collision, a 1950 book of pseudoscientific speculation by Immanuel Velikovsky

Footnotes

References

External links
 
 

1933 American novels
1933 science fiction novels
American science fiction novels
Post-apocalyptic novels
Novels about impact events
Works originally published in Blue Book (magazine)
Novels first published in serial form
American adventure novels adapted into films
Rogue planets in fiction
Novels by Edwin Balmer
Novels by Philip Wylie
Science fiction novels adapted into films
Novels set in South Africa
Collaborative novels
Frederick A. Stokes Company books